Charles II of Spain (6 November 1661 – 1 November 1700), known as the Bewitched, was the last Habsburg ruler of the Spanish Empire. Best remembered for his physical disabilities and the War of the Spanish Succession that followed his death, Charles's reign has traditionally been viewed as one of managed decline. However, many of the issues Spain faced in this period were inherited from his predecessors and some recent historians have suggested a more balanced perspective.

For reasons that are still debated, Charles experienced extended periods of ill health throughout his life and from the moment he became king at the age of three in 1665, the succession was a prominent consideration in European politics. Historian John Langdon-Davies summarised his life as follows: "Of no man is it more true to say that in his beginning was his end; from the day of his birth, they were waiting for his death". Despite this, his successors inherited an Empire that remained largely intact, while under his administration Spain played a prominent role in opposing the expansionist policies of Louis XIV of France.

Although Charles married twice, neither union produced children, and on his death in November 1700, he was succeeded by the 16-year-old Philip of Anjou, grandson of his elder sister Maria Theresa of Spain and Louis XIV. However, the question of who inherited the crown was less important than the division of his territories, and failure to resolve the issue through diplomacy led to war in 1701.

Personal details
Born on 6 November 1661, Charles was the only surviving son of 26-year-old Mariana of Austria (1634–1696) and her uncle, 56-year-old Philip IV of Spain (1605–1665). While European nobility commonly married within the same extended family to retain property, the Spanish and Austrian Habsburgs were unusual in the extent to which they followed this policy. Of eleven marriages contracted by Spanish monarchs between 1450 and 1661, the vast majority contained some element of consanguinity, while Philip and Mariana were one of two unions between uncle and niece. One suggestion is this policy may have been partially driven by Spanish  or "blood purity" statutes enacted in the early 16th century and which remained in use until the 1860s.

Inter-marriage accentuated the so-called 'Habsburg jaw', a physical characteristic common to both Spanish and Austrian Habsburgs; a contemporary reported this was so pronounced in Charles that he swallowed his food without thoroughly chewing, which resulted in frequent stomach problems. A study conducted in 2019 on the Habsburg jaw concluded a genetic link was highly likely, specifically as a recessive trait; however, this is based on an analysis of portraits and in the absence of genetic material such claims remain speculative.

Historians Will and Ariel Durant famously described Charles as "short, lame, epileptic, senile and completely bald before 35, always on the verge of death but repeatedly baffling Christendom by continuing to live." The degree to which inbreeding was responsible for his ill-health is unclear and disputed; his elder sister, Margaret Theresa of Spain, did not have the same problems, nor did the daughter from her marriage to her uncle Leopold. Based on an analysis of contemporary accounts, Charles may have had combined pituitary hormone deficiency and distal renal tubular acidosis. One suggestion is his health problems derived from a herpetic infection shortly after birth, while his autopsy report indicates hydrocephalus.

After his birth, he was entrusted to the royal governess Mariana Engracia Álvarez de Toledo Portugal y Alfonso-Pimentel. Under her careful supervision, he survived childhood attacks of measles, chickenpox, rubella and smallpox, any one of which was then potentially fatal. He also had rickets, which left him unable to walk unaided until he was four and compelled him to wear leg braces until the age of five. Suggestions that Charles was left largely uneducated until his teens appear to be incorrect; Ramos del Manzano, a professor at the University of Salamanca and legal expert, was appointed his tutor when he was six. From the age of 12, he received lessons in music from Juan del Vado and in mathematics by Jose Zaragoza, Professor at the Colegio Imperial de Madrid, whom he later commissioned to carry out a number of engineering projects in Spain.

The extent of his alleged physical and mental disabilities is hard to assess, since very little is known for certain and much of what is suggested is either unproved or incorrect. While prone to illness, he was extremely active physically and contemporaries reported he spent much of his time hunting. One often cited example of his alleged mental incapacity is the period he spent sleeping with his father's disinterred body; this was in fact done under instructions from Mariana, whose doctors advised this would help him produce an heir. Although he was reputedly subject to bouts of depression, his participation in government and reports from his council and foreign observers such as the French ambassador Jean-Baptiste Colbert, Marquess of Torcy, indicate his mental capacities remained intact.

This is confirmed by a 1691 report submitted by an envoy from Ismail Ibn Sharif, Sultan of Morocco; sent to negotiate an exchange of prisoners, he was received by Charles himself, who played a full part in the discussions. Costanzo Operti, a Savoyard diplomat who held regular audiences with Charles during the Nine Years' War, described him as affable and generous but shy and lacking self-confidence, characteristics noted by other foreign diplomats.

Reign

Since Charles was a legal minor when Philip died on 17 September 1665, Mariana was appointed Queen Regent by the Council of Castile. The Spanish Empire remained an enormous global confederation, but its economic supremacy was increasingly challenged by the Dutch Republic and England, and its position in Europe destabilised by the expansionist policies of Louis XIV of France. Even modern criticisms of Mariana's competence in dealing with these issues are often based on reports by contemporaries, who generally believed women were incapable of exercising power on their own.

Her ability to respond effectively to the challenges facing the Empire was hampered by an ongoing power struggle with Don Juan José de Austria, Charles's older illegitimate half-brother. In addition, enacting essential reforms was complicated since Spain was a personal union between the Crown of Castile and Crown of Aragon, each with very distinct political cultures and traditions. Infighting between those who ruled in Charles's name during his regency did little to help, but it is debatable how far they can be held responsible for long-term trends predating his reign. The monarchy proved remarkably resilient, and when Charles died, remained largely intact.

However, government finances were in perpetual crisis, the Crown declaring bankruptcy nine times between 1557 and 1666, including 1647, 1652, 1662, and 1666. Following the policy established by her husband Philip, Mariana ruled through a "", the first being her personal confessor and fellow Austrian, Juan Everardo Nithard. His most urgent task was to end the costly wars with Portugal and France, achieved in the 1668 treaties of Aix-la-Chapelle and Lisbon. Despite acknowledging their necessity, Don Juan forced Mariana to dismiss Nithard in February 1669, who replaced him with Fernando de Valenzuela. A member of the lower  class, his appointment was deeply resented by the Grandees who normally filled such positions.

In 1673, Spain was drawn into the Franco-Dutch War, placing additional strain on the economy and Don Juan renewed his efforts to remove Mariana as Regent. At his urging, Charles sent him an official summons in October 1675, a month before he reached the age of fourteen and became an adult; this instructed his brother to report to his chambers on 6 November and indicated his intention to take control of government. When the Regency Council and Mariana requested a two-year extension of the regency on 4 November, Charles refused but was then pressured into accepting and forced to issue a Royal Decree ordering Don Juan to leave Madrid.

Don Juan finally gained control of the government in January 1678 and exiled Valenzuela to the Philippines. His first action was to make peace with France in the 1678 Treaties of Nijmegen, with Spain ceding Franche-Comté and areas of the Spanish Netherlands returned in 1668. Seeking to minimise future conflict between the two countries, in August 1679 Don Juan brokered a match between Charles and the 17-year-old Marie Louise of Orléans, eldest niece of Louis XIV and daughter of Philippe I, Duke of Orléans. While the French ambassador wrote "... he is so ugly as to cause fear, and looks ill", it was considered irrelevant to the political benefits. Arranging the marriage was Don Juan's last significant act; he died shortly before it took place in November 1679.

In February 1680, the Duke of Medinaceli became the new . He clashed with Marie-Louise over the alleged influence exerted over her by the French ambassador, Pierre de Villars, who was expelled from Madrid in 1681, badly affecting the relationship between the two. Medinaceli was further undermined by economic problems and the loss of Luxembourg following the 1683 War of the Reunions. In June 1684, he sought to bolster his support by appointing the Count of Oropesa as President of the Council of Castile, the second most powerful position in the state. However, continuing ill-health led him to resign in April 1685, with Oropesa taking over as de facto . He retained this position until 1690.

The so-called "Little Ice Age" of the 17th century was a period of crisis throughout Europe, leading to poor harvests and economic decline. Spain was especially affected, due in part to the parlous economic situation, particularly in Castille, where the population dropped from 6.5 million in 1600 to less than 5 million in 1680, while figures for Spain as a whole were 8.5 to 6.6 million. This was exacerbated by a series of wars with France and the need to defend the Empire, which were a constant drain on public expenditure. In 1663, Philip IV had converted state debt into government bonds, or juros, but a history of default required high rates of interest, meaning taxes were often assigned to creditors years in advance to pay current liabilities. Although silver bullion imports from the Americas increased, the vast majority went to paying off foreign debtors.

One less obvious side effect of this globalisation of the Spanish trading system was that its opponents had the most to lose from its collapse. By the 1670s, foreign trade was controlled by Dutch and English merchants, while the domestic economy relied on French labour and imported wheat. The Marqués de Varinas, a senior colonial official, observed in 1687 that the Empire continued to exist in its present form "only because it enables the English, Dutch and French to exploit [it] more cheaply". In the 1680s, Spanish officials took steps to restore faith in the currency and issued a series of drastic deflationary decrees, revaluing the coinage at 25% of its previous value. The immediate impact was the total disruption of commerce and collapse of financial credit; in response, debtors were given three months to repay government debts using the existing rate, later extended to six months. Having stabilised the position, in 1686, the coinage was readjusted to a more favourable rate and thereafter left unaltered.

The domestic political situation was transformed when Marie-Louise died in February 1689, shortly after the outbreak of war with France; based on the description of her symptoms, modern doctors believe her illness was almost certainly appendicitis. In August, Charles married Maria Anna of Neuburg by proxy, the formal wedding taking place in May 1690. Mariana died on 16 May 1696 and Maria Anna took control of access to Charles. By now it was clear Charles's health was finally failing and agreeing on a successor became increasingly urgent. The Nine Years' War showed France could not achieve its objectives on its own; the 1697 Treaty of Ryswick was the result of mutual exhaustion and Louis's search for allies in anticipation of a contest over the Spanish throne. Emperor Leopold refused to sign since it left the issue unresolved; he reluctantly did so in October 1697, but viewed it as a pause in hostilities.

Succession

Although Charles was reportedly devoted to her, Marie Louise was blamed for the failure to produce an heir, while primitive fertility treatments gave her severe intestinal problems. There has been considerable debate as to whether Charles was impotent, and if so, the cause; based on private interviews with Marie Louise, he may have experienced premature ejaculation. The suggestion this resulted from inbreeding has not been proved, while a number of scientific studies dispute any linkage between fertility and consanguinity. After Marie Louise died in February 1689, Charles married Maria Anna of Neuburg, daughter of Philip William, Elector Palatine, and sister-in-law to Emperor Leopold, who was selected partly because her family was famous for its fertility.

Despite these hopes, Maria Anna was no more successful in producing an heir than her predecessor, almost certainly because Charles was by now physically incapable of doing so; his autopsy later revealed his sole remaining testicle was atrophied. The question of the succession became increasingly urgent; since the Crown of Spain passed according to cognatic primogeniture, it could be inherited through the female line. This enabled Charles's sisters Maria Theresa (1638–1683) and Margaret Theresa to pass their rights to the children of their marriages with Louis XIV and Emperor Leopold. However, to prevent a union between Spain and France, Maria Theresa had renounced her inheritance rights on her marriage; in return, Louis was promised a dowry of 500,000 gold écus, a huge sum that was never paid.

In 1685, Leopold and Margaret's daughter Maria Antonia married Max Emanuel of Bavaria; she died in 1692, leaving one surviving son, Joseph Ferdinand. In October 1698, France, England and the Dutch Republic attempted to impose a diplomatic solution to the Succession on Spain and Austria, by the Treaty of the Hague or First Partition Treaty. This made Joseph Ferdinand heir to the bulk of the Spanish monarchy, with France gaining the Kingdoms of Naples and Sicily and other concessions in Italy plus the modern Basque province of Gipuzkoa. Leopold's younger son Archduke Charles became ruler of the Duchy of Milan, a possession considered vital to the security of Austria's southern border.

The Spanish objected to their empire being divided by foreign powers without consultation, and on 14 November 1698, Charles II made Joseph Ferdinand heir to an independent and undivided Spanish monarchy. Maria Anna was appointed Regent during his minority, an announcement allegedly received by the Spanish councillors in silence. Joseph Ferdinand's death in 1699 ended these arrangements. It also left Louis XIV's eldest son, the Grand Dauphin, heir to the Spanish throne, once again implying union between Spain and France. In March 1700, France, England and the Dutch agreed an alternative; Archduke Charles replaced Joseph Ferdinand, with Spanish possessions in Europe split between France, Savoy and Austria. Charles reacted by altering his will in favour of Archduke Charles, but once again stipulating an undivided and independent Spanish monarchy.

Most of the Spanish nobility disliked Maria Anna and her German courtiers and viewed a French candidate as more likely to ensure their independence. In September 1700, Charles became ill again; by 28 September he was no longer able to eat, and Portocarrero persuaded him to alter his will in favour of Louis XIV's grandson, Philip of Anjou. He died on 1 November 1700, five days before his 39th birthday; Philip was proclaimed King of Spain on the 16th, and the War of the Spanish Succession began on 9 July 1701.

The autopsy records his "heart was the size of a peppercorn; his lungs corroded; his intestines rotten and gangrenous; he had a single testicle, black as coal, and his head was full of water." As suggested previously, these are indicative of hydrocephalus, a disease often associated with childhood measles, one of many illnesses contracted by Charles.

Legacy
The 35-year reign of Charles II has traditionally been viewed as one of decline and decay; in 1691, a foreign ambassador commented that "it is incomprehensible how this monarchy survives". More recent studies have criticised these views, historian Luis Ribot arguing "both the myth of decline and an incapable king are simplistic and inexact". Others attest his reign was crucial for the clearest signs of demographic recovery after decades of crisis, the first major attempts to reform peninsula trade, and the beginning of a more open approach to European thought and science.

Although both the Spanish state and economy relied on silver and gold mined in the Americas, this had been the case since the 16th century, while bullion imports reached historic highs between 1670 and 1700. Despite their disastrous short-term impact, the financial measures ended the chronic instability which had affected the Spanish currency throughout the 17th century and helped drive sustainable economic growth. Many of the commercial and political policies initiated under Charles formed the basis for reforms enacted by his Bourbon successors.

One of the institutions affected was the formerly powerful Spanish Inquisition, whose attempts to rebuild its influence by holding a large  during Charles' reign was negated by involvement in the political struggle over the succession. When Charles changed his will in favour of Philip in 1700, the Inquisitor General Baltasar de Mendoza y Sandoval, an ally of Maria Anna, arrested his personal confessor Froilán Díaz on a charge of 'bewitching' the king. When Díaz was found not guilty, Mendoza attempted to arrest those who voted for his acquittal, resulting in the establishment of a Council to investigate the Inquisition; although it survived until 1834, its influence had ended.

Though not as fond of the arts as his father, Charles employed artists like the Italian painter Luca Giordano and Claudio Coello to decorate the Escorial. In 1690, the latter created one of the last and most significant examples of Spanish Baroque painting, Charles II adores the Holy Eucharist.

On 7 November 1693, a Royal Decree provided sanctuary in Spanish Florida for escaped slaves from the nearby colony of South Carolina. Despite its relative poverty, Spanish Florida provided protection from storms in the Gulf of Mexico for Spanish merchant shipping; the decree was intended to bolster its population, while undermining the neighbouring colony, which claimed the Spanish capital of St. Augustine. Formalised in 1733 by Philip, it led to the founding in 1738 of Santa Teresa de Mose, the first legally sanctioned free black town in the present-day United States.

The Caroline Islands and the town of Charleroi in modern Belgium were named after him in 1666 and 1686 respectively. Decrees were also issued in his name approving universities in South America which still exist.

Heraldry

Ancestry

Notes

References

Sources

 
 
 
 
 
 
 
 
 
 
 
 
 
 
 
 
 
 
 
 
 
 
 
 
 
 
 
 
 
 
 
 
 
 
 
 
 
 
  
 
 
 
 
 
 
 
 
 

|-

|-

 
1661 births
1700 deaths
17th-century Spanish monarchs
17th-century Castilian monarchs
17th-century Aragonese monarchs
17th-century Kings of Sicily
17th-century monarchs of Naples
17th-century Navarrese monarchs
Burials in the Pantheon of Kings at El Escorial
Grand Masters of the Order of the Golden Fleece
Incest
Knights of Santiago
Knights of the Golden Fleece
Modern child monarchs
Nobility from Madrid
People with epilepsy
Philip IV of Spain
Princes of Asturias
Royalty and nobility with disabilities
Spanish infantes
Spanish people with disabilities
17th-century House of Habsburg